Yangtze High School is attached to Nanjing Normal University. It is a full-time independent senior school located in the Nanjing industrial development zone. It covers an area of 250 acres, including 87,895 square meters of construction areas.
Yangtze High School is a Four-Star school in Jiangsu province(江苏省四星级学校). It has earned many awards, such as "Jiangsu Province Four-Star School" (江苏省重点高中), "Jiangsu Model School" (江苏省模范学校), and National Model Public High School" (国家级示范性普通高中). Yangtze High School was founded by the Yangtze Petrochemical Group (扬子石化) in 1984. It was put under the local education department in October 2004.

References

External links 

High schools in Nanjing
Educational institutions established in 1984
1984 establishments in China